The Warner Bros. Album is the name of a demo tape by the unnamed avant-garde group who would later become known as The Residents, recorded in 1970 and 1971, but not officially released until 2018 as a Record Store Day limited edition vinyl release.

History
One of the group's earliest known recordings, The Warner Bros. Album was compiled as a demo reel to showcase their talents, and was sent anonymously to Hal Halverstadt, the executive who signed Captain Beefheart and his Magic Band to Warner Bros. Records. The group had hoped that Halverstadt would appreciate their earnest experiments and, ideally, offer them a budget and a major label platform. Halverstadt was not overly impressed with the tape, describing it as "okay at best", but awarded it an "A for Ariginality". The tape was returned, and addressed to "Residents, 20 Sycamore St., San Francisco," which led the group to briefly take the name Residents Unincorporated, and then later The Residents.

The existence of several early recordings would be hinted at in Ralph Records publications and The Residents' own album liner notes throughout the 1970s. The Warner Bros. Album and Baby Sex were both broadcast to the public in their entirety on KBOO-FM radio in Portland, Oregon, during a Residents radio festival in 1977. For many years afterwards, both albums circulated among fans and eventually on the internet, having been sourced from home recordings of this broadcast.

In 2004, a remix album, WB: RMX, was released by The Cryptic Corporation as a response to the bootleg recordings of the tape were already being circulated on the Internet. It featured radically remixed versions of a number of the songs from the original tape, with a more modern production style and little resemblance to the original recordings.

Release
Edited excerpts from the original tape would become officially available for the first time on the ERA B474 and The Delta Nudes' Greatest Hiss compilation albums in 2012 and 2013. These albums also included previously unheard alternative takes of "Sweet Meat" (under the name "Goodbye Lover") and "Maggie's Farm".

The demo was finally released in a new remaster of its original unedited mix on Record Store Day in April 2018. Issued under the name The W***** B*** Album as a special entry in The Residents' pREServed series of re-issues, the album was available in a limited pressing of 900 copies. In 2019, Cherry Red Records released a double-CD anthology, A Nickle If Your Dick’s This Big (1971-1972), which included both The W***** B*** Album and B.S. in their entirety, remastered from the original tapes.

Track listing
All songs written and composed by The Pre-Residents, except where noted.

References and footnotes

The Residents albums
2018 albums
Demo albums
Record Store Day releases
Cultural depictions of the Beatles